Alvecote is a hamlet in the North Warwickshire district of Warwickshire, England, situated on the county border with Staffordshire. Other settlements nearby are Shuttington (where population details can be found), Polesworth and the Tamworth district of Amington. Central Tamworth is approximately 3 miles west-southwest of Alvecote. 

Alvecote has a marina on the Coventry Canal with many facilities including boat repair, pumpout and a licensed bar. The West Coast Main Line runs through the settlement.  The nearest railway station is Polesworth, though that station now only sees one westbound parliamentary train per day. Alvecote Priory is a ruined 12th century Benedictine monastery. The nearest existing church is in Shuttington.

References

External links

Villages in Warwickshire
Borough of North Warwickshire